Salapalayam is one of the villages in the Namakkal District in which there are about 250 families. In the village the majority of the people are from Kongu Vellalar or nearby Arunthathiyar.

 Nearest Post Office : Reddipatti
 Occupation of people: Agriculture, road haulage.
 Total Families: 250
 Nearest town: Namakkal
 Nearest State HighWay: SH 161 Thuraiyur–Namakkal road
 Religion: Hindu
 Castes of people: Kongu Vellala Gounder, Arunthathiyar

Villages in Namakkal district